Georgie Lilly Perris-Redding (born 1 October 1997) is an American rugby union player. She plays Flanker for the United States internationally and for Sale Sharks in the Premier 15s.

Rugby career 
Perris-Redding signed with Sale Sharks in 2020 with her twin sister India. She featured for the USA Falcons in their 31–23 victory over Wales in Llanelli.

Perris-Redding was named in the United States squad to the 2022 Pacific Four Series in New Zealand. She was named in the starting line-up when she debuted for the Eagles against Canada at the Series. She later earned her second test cap off the bench against the Black Ferns.

In August 2022, Perris-Redding played in a warm-up match against Scotland. She also played in the warm-up game against England at Sandy Park. She was later selected in the Eagles squad for the delayed 2021 Rugby World Cup in New Zealand.

References

External links 

 Eagles Profile

Living people
1997 births
Female rugby union players
American female rugby union players
United States women's international rugby union players